The Hawthorne Bridge is a truss bridge with a vertical lift that spans the Willamette River in Portland, Oregon, joining Hawthorne Boulevard and Madison Street.  It is the oldest vertical-lift bridge in operation in the United States and the oldest highway bridge in Portland.  It is also the busiest bicycle and transit bridge in Oregon, with over 8,000 cyclists and 800 TriMet buses (carrying about 17,400 riders) daily. It was added to the National Register of Historic Places in November 2012.

Statistics 
The bridge consists of five fixed spans and one  vertical-lift span. The  counterweights are suspended from the two  towers. It is operated by a pair of 150-horsepower motors. On average, the lift span is raised for river traffic 120 times per month. As of 2001, the average daily traffic was 30,500 vehicles. The bridge was designed by Waddell & Harrington, which also designed the Steel and Interstate bridges. John Alexander Low Waddell invented the modern-day vertical-lift bridge.

History 
The current bridge was built to replace the second Madison Street Bridge, a wooden bridge built in 1900. It cost $511,000 to build and was opened on December 19, 1910. Hawthorne Boulevard (and thus the bridge) was named after Dr. J.C. Hawthorne, the cofounder of Oregon's first mental hospital and early proponent for the first Morrison Bridge.

The streetcar tracks across the bridge were originally in the outer lanes, but were relocated to the center lanes in 1931. The deck was changed from wood to steel grating in 1945.

In 1985 the lift span sheaves, the grooved wheels that guide the counterweight cables, were replaced. The bridge went through a $21 million renovation from 1998 to 1999, which included replacing the steel grated deck and repainting. The original lead-based paint was completely removed and replaced with 3 layers of new paint that is estimated to last 30 years. Due to the replacement of the steel deck during this project, the channels which used to carry the rails for streetcars and interurban trains were also removed. The bridge was closed for one year to permit the renovation to be carried out.

The original color of the bridge was black, lasting until 1964, when it was repainted yellow ochre.  During the 1998–99 renovation, the color was changed to green with red trim.

In 2001, the sidewalks were connected to the Eastbank Esplanade.  In 2005, the estimated cost to replace the bridge was $189.3 million.

The 2003 film, The Hunted, included a scene set on MAX on the Hawthorne Bridge.  Since MAX does not cross the bridge, the movie company connected two articulated buses remodeled to resemble a MAX train, complete with fake overhead lines and a sprinkler system to simulate rain.  Light-rail (interurban) service did cross the Hawthorne Bridge until 1956.

The new deck put in place in the outer lanes during the 1998–99 renovation was designed to be strong enough for possible use by modern, heavier streetcars or light rail trains in the future, which was proposed at that time, and TriMet was still considering a Hawthorne Bridge routing for its future MAX Orange Line, to Milwaukie, in 2002.  However, following the transit agency's later decision to build the Tilikum Crossing for the Milwaukie MAX line, which bridge could also be used by the Portland Streetcar, it became unlikely that rail cars will ever again cross the Hawthorne Bridge.

The bridge was added to the National Register of Historic Places in November 2012.

Bicycle counter 
In August 2012, an automated real-time bicycle counter was installed on the bridge, the first such counter to be installed in a U.S. city. It was purchased by the non-profit group Cycle Oregon for $20,000 and donated to the city. The city paid $5,000 for its installation. The millionth rider was counted in July 2013. It is currently broken and has not recorded data since 2018.

Pop culture references
 Elliott Smith mentions the Hawthorne Bridge in the song "I Can't Answer You Anymore."
 Portland composer, Jack Gabel, sampled tire whines and engine drones of vehicles crossing the bridge to make the musique concrète sound track for his 1987 Artquake/Bumbershoot installation, in collaboration with kinetic artist Bill Will and video artist Kurt Spak, titled AUTO-TOMY 
 The Hawthorne Bridge is mentioned in House Of Leaves by Mark Z. Danielewski at bottom of p. 508 during one of Johnny Truant's late journal entries. "Portland. Dusk. Walked under the Hawthorne bridge and sat by the Willamette River."

Gallery

See also
Hands Across Hawthorne
List of bridges documented by the Historic American Engineering Record in Oregon
List of bridges on the National Register of Historic Places in Oregon
List of crossings of the Willamette River

References

External links 

Hawthorne Bridge page on Multnomah County website

Photo of the 1910 construction crew

Bridges in Portland, Oregon
Vertical lift bridges in Oregon
Bridges completed in 1910
Bridges over the Willamette River
Historic American Engineering Record in Oregon
National Register of Historic Places in Portland, Oregon
Road bridges on the National Register of Historic Places in Oregon
1910 establishments in Oregon
Buckman, Portland, Oregon
Drawbridges on the National Register of Historic Places
Southwest Portland, Oregon
Hosford-Abernethy, Portland, Oregon
Portland Historic Landmarks
Tom McCall Waterfront Park
Steel bridges in the United States
Parker truss bridges in the United States